Name Your Adventure is an American reality series that aired on Saturday mornings during NBC's TNBC line-up. Created and executive produced by Kerri Zane and Scott Friedland. The series was hosted by Mario Lopez, Jordan Brady, and Tatyana Ali, the series ran from September 12, 1992 to September 2, 1995.

Synopsis
The show was about making the dreams of ordinary teenagers come true. Viewers would submit letters to be chosen. Then the hosts of the show would go to a lucky teenager's house, surprise him or her and join in as he or she experienced the ultimate adventure, whether it was to be an actor, a track star or an astrologer.

On one episode, a teenager got to meet President Bill Clinton. Another episode saw Mario Lopez take a teen who wanted to be an Olympic diver on an adventure to meet Olympic Diving Gold Medalist, Greg Louganis. Another featured a teen becoming a roadie and setting up a concert for Richard Marx. Other episodes featured teenagers in Alaska with working alongside the U.S.G.S. A pas de deux with the lead dancers of the Joffrey Ballet. Tap dancing with Gregory Hines, to name a few.

Awards and nominations

External links

1992 American television series debuts
1995 American television series endings
1990s American reality television series
English-language television shows
NBC original programming
TNBC
Television series about teenagers